The 2003–04 Polska Liga Hokejowa season was the 69th season of the Polska Liga Hokejowa, the top level of ice hockey in Poland. Eight teams participated in the league, and Unia Oswiecim won the championship.

Regular season

Playoffs

External links
 Season on hockeyarchives.info

Polska Hokej Liga seasons
Polska
Polska